Comunhão Reformada Batista do Brasil was founded on June 10, 2004, by individuals from different denominations and subscribes the in Petrolândia, Pernambuco and subscribes the 1689 Baptist Confession of Faith in Brazil. It is a federation of churches. The 6th Congress of the Communion of Reformed Baptists in Brazil was held in 2011. Theologically Reformed, but practices credobaptism. It subscribes the Five Solas, Sola Scriptura, Solus Christus, Soli Deo Gloria, Sola Fide, Sola Gratia.

External links 
Blog
Second London Baptist Confession

References 

Reformed Baptists denominations